The  Centro Andino is a shopping mall located in the El Retiro neighborhood of Bogotá, Colombia. It is one of the largest shopping malls in Bogota and in South America in general. Andino is made up of a business center and a shopping mall. It is also the home of the only Louis Vuitton, Dolce & Gabbana, Longchamp and Tiffany & Co. stores in the country, becoming the most exclusive and expensive mall in Colombia.

History 

The Andino Mall is located on the old school grounds of the Alemán Andino High School, hence the name of the complex. The site was developed by Pedro Gómez y Cia construction firm and was overseen by architect Piedad Gómez.

The planning took ten years, and its construction began in 1992. It was completed in 1993, along with a business center annex.

Other projects have been developed in the surrounding area, including the El Retiro and Atlantis shopping malls. Jointly, these sites have transformed the feel of the area from a primarily residential and housing neighborhood to a distinctly commercial and urban space, including buildings up to 10 stories tall.

Renovations 
In 2005, a food court was constructed that included the largest structural dome in the country. On March 3, 2012, there was an announcement that 22 stores distributed over 4 stories will be added.

Accidents 
Since the construction of the mall, there have been a few accidents that have resulted in casualties and deaths.

Fire 
In February 2008, there was a fire on the third floor of the mall. The fire left three people injured: two having suffered smoke inhalation, and one sustaining cuts on the hand. The most damage was caused when the roof collapsed on one of the rooms in the movie theater. It was later discovered that the fire was caused by a short circuit.

Bombing 

On 17 June 2017, a bomb exploded in a second-floor bathroom of the mall, killing three women and injuring about nine others. One of the victims was a 23-year-old French woman who had spent six months volunteering in Colombia. The other two killed were Colombians. Eight people from a leftist urban guerilla group called the "People's Revolutionary Movement" were arrested.

See also 
 Centro Comercial Santafé
 Bogotá
 Zona Rosa de Bogotá

References 

 Shopping malls in Bogotá
 Commercial buildings completed in 1995
 Shopping malls in Colombia